Pasupathy Ariyaratnam is a Sri Lankan Tamil civil servant, politician and provincial councillor.

Ariyaratnam was director of education for the Kilinochchi Education Zone and Mullaitivu Education Zone and Additional Provincial Director of Education for the Vanni region.

Ariyaratnam contested the 2013 provincial council election as one of the Tamil National Alliance's candidates in Kilinochchi District and was elected to the Northern Provincial Council. After the election he was appointed to assist the Chief Minister on local government. He took his oath as provincial councillor in front of Chief Minister C. V. Vigneswaran at Veerasingam Hall on 11 October 2013.

References

Illankai Tamil Arasu Kachchi politicians
Living people
Members of the Northern Provincial Council
People from Northern Province, Sri Lanka
Sri Lankan Tamil civil servants
Sri Lankan Tamil politicians
Tamil National Alliance politicians
Year of birth missing (living people)